Mark Szaranek (born 16 August 1995) is a Scottish swimmer. He currently represents the Cali Condors which is part of the International Swimming League. Szaranek's swimming career began with his father, John, as coach. He first trained at Glenrothes Swimming Club and was coached by his father at Carnegie swimming club and then the University of Edinburgh where he is performance coach.

Career
At the 2017 World Championships, Budapest he competed in the British team in the Men's 200 meter and 400 meter Individual medley events.

At the 2018 Commonwealth Games Szaranek won a silver medal in the Men's 400 meter individual medley with a personal best time of 4:13.72.

In 2019 he was a member of the inaugural International Swimming League representing the Cali Condors, who finished third place in the final match in Las Vegas, Nevada in December. Szaranek placed 2nd in the 400 meter IM two times during the season as well as strong finishes in the 200 meter IM and 200 meter butterfly.

References

External links
 

1995 births
Living people
British male swimmers
Commonwealth Games medallists in swimming
Commonwealth Games silver medallists for Scotland
Commonwealth Games bronze medallists for Scotland
Swimmers at the 2018 Commonwealth Games
Swimmers at the 2022 Commonwealth Games
Scottish male swimmers
Florida Gators men's swimmers
Medallists at the 2018 Commonwealth Games
Medallists at the 2022 Commonwealth Games